Monoranjan Bhattacharya, nicknamed Mona, is a retired Indian professional footballer and football manager. During his playing career, he represented the "Big Two" of Kolkata football, East Bengal and Mohun Bagan. He also represented India in various international tournaments between 1978 and 1989.

He was one of the finest Indian stopper-back during his time in Indian football. Foreigners who played against him have said he was physically strong, was good in aerial tussles and a very clean tackler. East Bengal supporters worship him. Legendary football coach Amal Dutta was influential nurturing talents including Bhattacharya.

Club career
Bhattacharya appeared with Calcutta Football League club George Telegraph, before joining East Bengal Club in 1977. With the "red and gold brigade", he created a club record for continuously representing the club in a period spanning fourteen years. He was one of the most successful defenders of his time and was known for his strong and skillful game. He captained the club in 1981–82 season. In 1985, he won Federation Cup with the club and went on to represent his team at the 1985–86 Asian Club Championship in Saudi Arabia. Managed by legendary P. K. Banerjee, his team played in the Central Asia Zone (tournament named "Coca-Cola Cup"), where they defeated numerous foreign clubs to win it. They defeated New Road Team of Nepal 7–0, Abahani Krira Chakra of Bangladesh 1–0, thrashed Club Valencia of the Maldives 9–0 (the biggest margin of victory by an Indian team over any foreign opponents).

In the 1980s, Bhattacharya as stopper-back and Bhaskar Ganguly as goalkeeper, made East Bengal defense unbreakable. In 1986, both him and Bhaskar Ganguly were signed by Bangladeshi club Abahani Krira Chakra for a crucial Dhaka Derby match to decide the Dhaka League champions. However, after suffering a 2–0 defeat, both players returned to East Bengal. At the end of 1990–91 season, he left East Bengal to join their arch-rival Mohun Bagan AC. After spending a couple of seasons with Mohun Bagan, Monoranjan returned to East Bengal in 1993 for his last season as a player.

International career
Monoranjan was a regular for India national football team between 1978 and 1989 and competed football tournaments within the period. He is praised for his performance against Argentina in 1984 Nehru Cup, where India was narrowly defeated by 1–0 with the goal from Ricardo Gareca.

Coaching career
Monoranjan is a qualified AFC coach who managed East Bengal Club from 1996 to 1998 and again in the season of 2000–01. Under his coaching, the club won its first National Football League title in 2000–01. In that season, they won Federation Cup. Due to East Bengal FC's poor showing in the inaugural 2007–08 I-League, their coach Subrata Bhattacharya resigned and Monoranjan became the coach of East Bengal for the third time. He guided the club hanging in the relegation zone to a sixth-place finish in the I-League. After the league ended, he decided not continue in the post citing prior family engagements.

In 2008, he was appointed head coach of DSA Senior Division side Hindustan FC for a season.

In 2018, Bhattacharya was appointed head coach of CFL Premier Division side Tollygunge Agragami.

Career statistics

Managerial

Honours

Player
East Bengal
Federation Cup: 1978–79, 1980–81, 1985
IFA Shield: 1984, 1986, 1990, 1991
Durand Cup: 1989, 1990, 1991, 1993
Calcutta Football League: 1985, 1987, 1988, 1989, 1991, 1993
Rovers Cup: 1990
Wai Wai Cup (Nepal): 1993
All Airlines Gold Cup: 1987, 1988, 1990
Darjeeling Gold Cup: 1985
SSS Trophy: 1989, 1991
Sait Nagjee Trophy: 1986
Stafford Cup: 1986

India
 South Asian Games Gold medal: 1985, 1987

Individual
 East Bengal "Lifetime Achievement Award": 2019

Manager
East Bengal
Federation Cup: 1996
National Football League: 2000–01

See also
 List of East Bengal Club captains
 List of East Bengal Club coaches
 List of India national football team captains

References

Bibliography

 

Chattopadhyay, Hariprasad (2017). Mohun Bagan–East Bengal . Kolkata: Parul Prakashan.

External links

News archive at The Times of India

Living people
Indian footballers
India international footballers
Footballers from Kolkata
East Bengal Club managers
East Bengal Club players
Mohun Bagan AC players
Abahani Limited (Dhaka) players
Indian expatriate footballers
Expatriate footballers in Bangladesh
Indian football coaches
Indian football managers
Association football defenders
Year of birth missing (living people)
Tollygunge Agragami FC managers
Footballers at the 1982 Asian Games
Asian Games competitors for India